Africano may refer to:
 Africano (song), a song by  Earth, Wind & Fire
 Africano (film), a 2001 Egyptian adventure comedy film